Ludger Beerbaum (born 26 August 1963 in Detmold, North Rhine-Westphalia) is an internationally successful German equestrian who competes in show jumping and has been ranked the No. 1 Show Jumper in the world by the FEI on multiple occasions. He is also a four-time Olympic Gold medalist team and individual.

Early life and competitive career 
Beerbaum was born in Detmold, Germany. In school, he took Business Studies, but eventually gave it up for a career in show jumping.

Beerbaum began riding on a Highland Pony at the age of 8. He had a very successful career as a young Rider which continued into his adulthood. His most notable accomplishments include winning 4 Olympic Golds (his first at age 25) and numerous European and World Championship medals.

On Sunday 21 September 2008, at the Samsung Super League Final in Barcelona, Beerbaum was a member of the winning German Nations Cup team. He was awarded Leading Rider of the 2008 Super League, along with 50,000 CHF ($46,000). In the Final, he rode the nine-year-old Westphalian gelding, All Inclusive NRW to a double clear round, and was one of only two riders to do so, his teammate Marco Kutscher being the other.

Family 
Ludger Beerbaum is the oldest of 4 children, his siblings being Ruth, Monika, and show jumper Markus Beerbaum.

He is married to Arundell Davison, with whom he has two daughters (Cecilia Sophie and Mathilde). From his previous marriage, he has a son (Alexander).

He is also brother-in-law to Meredith Michaels-Beerbaum.

Top horses 

 Goldfever: 1991 chestnut Hanoverian stallion (by Grosso Z)
 Classic Touch 1984 Bay (Holstein) Mare by  Caletto II (GOLD Barcelona olympics 1992)
 Ratina Z: 1982 bay Hanoverian mare (Ramiro Z x Almé Z)
 Gladdys S: 1992 chestnut Westphalian mare (Grandeur x Apart)
 PS Priamos: 1982 chestnut Westphalian gelding (Pilot x Direx)
 Enorm: 1997 bay Hanoverian gelding (Escudo I x Calypso II)
 Couleur Rubin: 1996 chestnut Oldenburg stallion (by Cordalme Z)
 L'Espoir: 1996 chestnut Zangersheide gelding (by Landwind II)
 All Inclusive: 1999 bay Westphalian gelding (Arpeggio x Phantom)

Doping offense 
At the 2004 Olympic Games, Beerbaum and his mount, Goldfever, managed to finish with only 4 penalty points, helping Germany earn the team gold medal. However, following the competition, Goldfever tested positive for the prohibited substance betamethasone. The International Equestrian Federation found Beerbaum guilty of breaking the rules, stripping both him and his German team of their medals, dropping Germany down to bronze. Beerbaum believed the substance to have been present in an ointment administered to the horse due to a skin irritation, and the FEI agreed that the substance provided no competitive advantage. However, in accordance with the rule, Beerbaum was disqualified.
Germany's team gold medal was then given to the Americans and the silver to the Swedish show jumping team. The Germans, however, were still able to take the bronze medal, even without Goldfever's results.

Major achievements

Olympic Games 
 Team gold medal - 1988 Olympic Games Seoul: 17.25 penalties (The Freak)
 Individual gold medal - 1992 Olympic Games Barcelona: 0 penalties (Classic Touch)
 Team gold medal - 1996 Olympic Games Atlanta: 1.75 penalties (Ratina Z)
 Team gold medal - 2000 Olympic Games Sydney: 15 penalties (Goldfever 3)
 Disqualified, losing team gold medal at the 2004 Olympic Games Athens—See "Doping Offense" above (Goldfever 3)
 Team bronze medal - 2016 Summer Olympics Rio: Casello

World Championships 
 Team silver medal & 73rd Individually - 1990 World Equestrian Games, Stockholm, Sweden (Gazelle)
 Team gold medal & 4th Individually - 1994 World Equestrian Games in The Hague, Netherlands (Ratina Z)
Team gold medal & 5th Individually - 1998 World Equestrian Games in Rome, Italy (P.S. Priamos)
 4th place & 22nd Individually - 2002 World Equestrian Games in Jerez de la Frontera, Spain (Gladdys S)
Team bronze medal & 5th Individually - 2006 World Equestrian Games in Aachen, Germany (L'Espoir)

European Championships 
 Team bronze & Individual bronze - 1984 CH-EU-Y in Cervia, Italy (Wittersfernde)
 Team 5th & Individually 23rd - 1987 CH-EU in St. Gallen, Switzerland (Wiener Domspatz)
 Team 5th & Individually 21st - 1991 CH-EU in La Baule, France (Grand Plaisir)
 Team 4th & Individually 29th - 1993 CH-EU in Gijon, Spain (Rush On)
 Team gold & Individual gold - 1997 CH-EU in Mannheim, Germany (Ratina Z)
 Team gold & Individually 26th - 1999 CH-EU in Hickstead, Great Britain (Champion du Lys)
 Team bronze & Individual gold - 2001 CH-EU in Arnhem, Netherlands (Gladdys S)
 Team gold & Individual silver - 2003 CH-EU in Donaueschingen, Germany (Goldfever 3)
 Team silver & Individual bronze - 2007 CH-EU in Mannheim, Germany (Goldfever 3)
 Team gold & Individually 8th - 2011 CH-EU in Madrid, Spain (Gotha FRH)
 Team silver & Individually 6th - 2013 CH-EU in Herning, Denmark (Chiara 222)
 Team silver & Individually 12th - 2015 CH-EU in Aachen, Germany (Chiara 222)

World Cup Final 
 1st - 1993 World Cup Final in Göteborg, Sweden (Ratina Z)
 4th - 1995 World Cup Final in Göteborg, Sweden (Gaylord & Ratina Z)
 6th - 1996 World Cup Final in Geneve, Switzerland (Gaylord & Rush On)
 3rd - 1998 World Cup Final in Helsinki, Finland (P.S. Priamos)
 6th - 1999 World Cup Final in Göteborg, Sweden (Ratina Z & P.S. Priamos)
 4th - 2000 World Cup Final in Las Vegas, USA (Goldfever 3)
 2nd - 2002 World Cup Final in Leipzig, Germany (Gladdys S)
 8th - 2003 World Cup Final in Las Vegas, USA (Goldfever 3)
 12th - 2005 World Cup Final in Las Vegas, USA (Couleur Rubin)
 4th - 2008 World Cup Final in Göteborg, Sweden (All Inclusive NRW)
 6th - 2009 World Cup Final in Las Vegas, USA (Coupe de Coeur)
 Joint 2nd - 2010 World Cup Final in Le Grand-Saconnex near Geneve, Switzerland (Gotha FRH)
 2nd - 2014 World Cup Final in Lyon, France (Chaman & Chiara 222)

Other major achievements 
 Multiple World No. 1 Show Jumper ranking by the FEI
 8-time winner of the German masters (1988, 1992, 1993, 1997, 1998, 2000, 2001, 2004)
 3-time Rider of the Year (2001, 2002, 2003)
 3-time winner of the Grand Prix of Aachen (1996 Ratina Z; 2002 and 2003 Goldfever 3)
 Winner of the Bambi prize in 1992
 Winner of the 2002 CN International at the Spruce Meadows Masters on the stallion, Goldfever 3.

References

External links 
 
 
 
 
  

1963 births
Living people
People from Detmold
Sportspeople from Detmold (region)
Equestrians at the 1988 Summer Olympics
Equestrians at the 1992 Summer Olympics
Equestrians at the 1996 Summer Olympics
Equestrians at the 2000 Summer Olympics
Equestrians at the 2004 Summer Olympics
Equestrians at the 2008 Summer Olympics
Equestrians at the 2016 Summer Olympics
German male equestrians
German sportspeople in doping cases
Olympic equestrians of Germany
Olympic equestrians of West Germany
Olympic gold medalists for Germany
Olympic bronze medalists for Germany
Olympic gold medalists for West Germany
German show jumping riders
Olympic medalists in equestrian
Competitors stripped of Summer Olympics medals
Medalists at the 2016 Summer Olympics
Medalists at the 2000 Summer Olympics
Medalists at the 1996 Summer Olympics
Medalists at the 1992 Summer Olympics
Medalists at the 1988 Summer Olympics
Horse trader